Datuk Seri Utama Haji Sulaiman bin Md Ali (born 20 December 1965) is a Malaysian politician who has served as the 12th Chief Minister of Malacca since March 2020 and Member of the Malacca State Legislative Assembly (MLA) for Lendu since May 2013. He served as the Deputy Member of the Malacca State Executive Council (EXCO) in the Barisan Nasional (BN) state administration under former Chief Minister and former Member Idris Haron from May 2013 to the collapse of the BN state administration in May 2018. He is a member of the United Malays National Organisation (UMNO), a component party of the federal and state ruling BN coalition which is aligned with another federal and state ruling Perikatan Nasional (PN) coalition at both the federal and state levels. On 4 October 2021, former Chief Minister of Melaka and Sungai Udang MLA Idris Haron and three other MLAs declared loss of confidence and support for him as Chief Minister and claimed that the state govermment has collapsed. However, the state government will only collapse when the chief minister resigns or loses the vote of a motion of confidence in the state legislative assembly. Following this, the Melaka State Legislative Assembly was dissolved the same day following his loss of majority support in the assembly and his state government stayed in power in caretaker capacity before the next government was formed after the 2021 Malacca state election on 20 November 2021. In the election, Barisan Nasional (BN) won 21 out of 28 state seats and therefore a two-thirds majority in the assembly, he remained as chief minister in the new government. The next day, Sulaiman was sworn in as chief minister.

Personal life
He is married to Munira M Yusop and has 3 children.

Election results

Honours

Honours of Malaysia
  :
  Medal of the Order of the Defender of the Realm (PPN) (2002)
 Officer of the Order of the Defender of the Realm (KMN) (2012)
  :
  Companion Class I of the Exalted Order of Malacca (DMSM) – Datuk (2015)
  Knight Grand Commander of the Exalted Order of Malacca (DUNM) – Datuk Seri Utama (2020)

References

External links 
 Sulaiman Md Ali on Facebook

1965 births
Living people
Malaysian people of Malay descent
Malaysian Muslims
United Malays National Organisation politicians
Chief Ministers of Malacca
Malacca state executive councillors
21st-century Malaysian politicians
Medallists of the Order of the Defender of the Realm
Officers of the Order of the Defender of the Realm